Cytel is a multinational statistical software developer and contract research organization, headquartered in Cambridge, Massachusetts, USA. Cytel provides clinical trial design, implementation services, and statistical products primarily for the biotech and pharmaceutical development markets.

Cytel specializes in adaptive trials – a type of randomized clinical trial that allows modifications of ongoing trials while aiming to preserve the statistical validity and integrity of the study. Based on either frequentist or Bayesian statistics, adaptive trial designs are now widely accepted by government regulatory agencies including the United States Food and Drug Administration (FDA), European Medicines Agency (EMA), and Medicines and Healthcare products Regulatory Agency (MHRA) in early and later stage clinical studies.

As of January 2014, the company claims 25 large biopharmaceutical companies as users of its software to design, simulate, and analyze trials.

Background
Company founders Cyrus Mehta, Ph.D. and Nitin Patel, Ph.D. are amongst the pioneering statisticians credited for developing the underlying statistical methods behind so-called “flexible” designs: group sequential and adaptive trials.

Cytel statisticians have collectively published over 140 papers in peer-reviewed statistical and medical journals.

Cytel Consulting

Cytel's Consulting arm focuses on optimizing the approach for biopharma clinical research development objectives. Functional elements their Strategic Consulting team claims to provide include:

 Adaptive Trial Design and Implementation
 Collaborative Research Projects
 Program and Portfolio Optimization
 Regulatory Interactions
 Multiplicity
 Missing Data
 DMC Membership
 Independent Statistical Committee
 Advanced real-world analytics
 Health Economics and Outcomes Research

Clinical Research Services

Cytel's Clinical Research Services arm focuses on improving the probability of success for biopharma clinical research development efforts. Functional elements their Clinical Research Services team claim to provide include:

 Support for DMCs
 Randomization Services
 Clinical Data Management
 Biostatistics
 Statistical Programming
 Medical Writing
 CDISC Migration
 Regulatory Submissions
 Quantitative Pharmacology
 Pharmacometrics
 Data Science
 Complex and Innovative Designs

Software
East
East Clinical trial statistical software for the design, simulation and monitoring of adaptive, group sequential and fixed sample size trials.  As of 2019, East 6.5 is in use at over 140 pharmaceutical and biotechnology companies, research centers and regulatory agencies including the FDA's Center for Drug Evaluation and Research, Center for Biologics Evaluation and Research and Center for Devices and Radiological Health divisions.

First introduced by the Cytel Software Corporation in 1995 as “East DOS”, the name is derived from the benefit of “Early stopping” a trial due to futility: a failure of the tested treatment to demonstrate significant improvement over an existing treatment and/or placebo.

Enforesys
Introduced by Cytel in 2015, Enforesys is a feasibility study decision-making tool for predicting recruitment milestones. Enforsys utilizes historical study site-level data and simulation models to calculate a numerical probability of success for study enrollment strategies.

Compass
Compass is used by biostatisticians and clinicians to plan and design earlier stage adaptive clinical trials (traditionally known as phase 1 human tolerance and phase 2 dose-selection studies).

Compass is the first commercially offered adaptive trial composition software with both frequentist and Bayesian methods.  Other key capabilities include R code integration, trial simulation compute engines, plus various tables, charts and graphs to visualize and communicate trial design attributes.

StatXact
Statistical software based on the exact branch of statistics used for small-sample categorical and nonparametric data problem-solving.  Utilized by statisticians and researchers in all fields of study, the StatXact software now has 150 different non-parametric statistical tests and procedures.

Initially offered in 1989 as StatXact DOS, StatXact 8 was released in 2007.  The StatXact PROCs variant integrates with the popular SAS statistical software.

LogXact
A logistic regression predictive modeling software package suited particularly to cases involving small samples and / or missing data.  Logistic regression is used extensively in the medical and social sciences as well as marketing applications to predict subject behavior.

First made available in 1996 under the name LogXact Turbo, LogXact was introduced in 2007 and is currently in its eleventh release.  The LogXact PROCs variant integrates with the popular SAS statistical software.

ACES
Cytel's web-based Access Controlled Execution System. ACES simplifies compliance with the related FDA guidance and EMA guidelines by a secure means of communicating a clinical trial's interim analysis results and recommendations between the Data Monitoring Committee (DMC/DSMB), Independent Statistical Center and clinical team members.  The validated system automatically creates an audit trial, allowing regulators to readily determine "who saw what and when".

SiZ
In 2012, SiZ as a stand-alone product was deprecated, and its feature set was consolidated into the company's East product.

OK GO
OK GO is the first commercially available software to support the implementation of a quantitative go/no-go decision-making framework in clinical trials.

Locations

United States
 Cambridge, Massachusetts (HQ)
 Waltham, MA
 King of Prussia, PA
 San Jose, CA

Canada
 Toronto, ON  
 Vancouver, BC

Europe
 Geneva, CH
 Paris, FR
 Barcelona, ES
 Basel, CH
 London, UK
 Rotterdam, NL

Asia

 Shanghai, CN
 Singapore, SG

India
 Pune
 Hyderabad
 Bengaluru
 Mumbai
 Ahmedabad

See also

 Biostatistics
 Clinical research
 Drug development
 Journal of the American Statistical Association
 Randomization
 Sample size determination

References

Biotechnology companies of the United States
Companies based in Massachusetts
Contract research organizations
Companies formerly listed on the Nasdaq
Drug discovery companies
Statistical service organizations